Anata e (To You) is a 2012 Japanese film directed by Yasuo Furuhata.

Plot

The story follows the journey of a man traveling some 1000 kilometers from Toyama City, Japan to his wife's hometown in Nagasaki Prefecture, in order to scatter her ashes into the sea. Along the way, he travels through several locations, including the ruins of Takeda Castle, Shimonoseki City, the Kanmon Bridge, Moji-ku, Kitakyūshū, and Sasebo, Nagasaki, recalling experiences with his wife along the way. He also befriends and is assisted by numerous strangers.

Teruo, a widower and wandering traveler, was driving throughout Japan with no home to go back to.  Teruo ended up being arrested for vandalizing places and properties.  After being arrested, Teruo told the cop that he had lost his way in life and resorted to vandalizing.

Yuji, a seafood salesperson, was traveling/wandering through Japan. Yuji later confessed that he could not go back home to his daughter and wife, as his wife was having an affair and he did not have the courage to confront her. He became a drifter as a result.

Nambara, an assistant to Yuji, was a fisherman from the village of the cop's wife. Nambara had incurred a large amount of debt. As he was unable to pay the debt, he faked his death to escape it.  He traveled with Yuji, as he had no home to go back to.

Having fulfilled his wife's wish, Kurashima mailed his resignation letter and embarked on his own journey, but not before giving Nambara a picture of his daughter before her wedding, which Nambara's wife had asked Kurashima to throw into the sea along with his wife's ashes.

The film ends with Kurashima walking aimlessly, Nambara standing with his daughter's picture, and Yuji busy serving customers not far away.

Cast
 Ken Takakura as Eiji Kurashima
 Yūko Tanaka as Yoko, his wife
 Kitano Takeshi as Sugino Teruo, Japanese literature teacher
 Tadanobu Asano as cop
 Tsuyoshi Kusanagi as Tamiya Yuji, food-stall cook
 Kōichi Satō as "Nambara", food-stall cook and former fisherman
 Haruka Ayase as Naoko Hamazaki, young waitress and Nambara's daughter
 Kimiko Yo as Tamiko Hamazaki, her mother, eatery owner, and Nambara's widow/wife
 Hideji Ōtaki as Ohura Goro, elderly boat owner, and estranged father of Nambara

Production
Around the time of filming, Takakura was 80 years of age. His role as Kurashima was his last before his death in 2014. Hideji Ōtaki, who played Nambara's estranged father, died a few months after the film's release.

References

External links
 

2012 films
Films about grieving
Japanese drama films
Films directed by Yasuo Furuhata
2010s Japanese films
2010s Japanese-language films